"I'll Never Smile Again" is a 1939 song written by Ruth Lowe. It has been recorded by many other artists since, becoming a standard.

The most successful and best-known million selling single version of the song was recorded by Tommy Dorsey and His Orchestra, with vocals provided by Frank Sinatra and The Pied Pipers. This recording was released as a Victor 78, 26628A, in 1940. This version was number one on Billboard'''s first "National List of Best Selling Retail Records"—the first official national music chart—on July 27, 1940, staying at the top spot for 12 weeks until October 12, 1940. The tune was inducted into the Grammy Hall of Fame in 1982.

Versions

 The Ink Spots recorded the song in August 1940, which was just a few months after the first release of the song.
The song appears on the 1954 Dave Brubeck Quartet live album Jazz at the College of the Pacific. Sarah Vaughan recorded the song on the 1955 In the Land of Hi-Fi. Billie Holiday recorded the song in 1959, the last year of her life, on the posthumous album Last Recording. The Platters brought the song back to the top 40 in 1961, where their version went to #25 on the Hot 100 and #17 on the Hot R&B Sides chart. 
 Al Hirt released a version in 1962 on his Trumpet and Strings 
 Bill Evans on the 1963 Interplay 
Frank Sinatra included it on his 1959 No One Cares album. He also re-recorded the song in 1965 for the double album A Man and His Music, complete with faithful reproduction of the celeste and choral accompaniment which characterized the 1940 recording.   
Italian-American crossover artist, Sergio Franchi covered this song on his 1967 RCA Victor album, From Sergio - With Love.
The song was also covered by popular Australian rock group Daddy Cool—they scored an Australian Top 20 hit with their version, which was released as a single in July 1972, shortly before the group broke up; they also performed it at their farewell concert in Melbourne, Australia in August 1972, which was recorded and subsequently released as a double-album in 1973.

See also
List of number-one singles of 1940 (U.S.)

References

Sources

Peter J. Levinson, Tommy Dorsey: Livin' in a Great Big Way: a Biography (Cambridge, MA: Da Capo Press, 2005). 
Robert L. Stockdale, Tommy Dorsey: On The Side'' (Metuchen, NJ: The Scarecrow Press, 1995). 

1940 songs
1940 singles
Songs written by Ruth Lowe
Tommy Dorsey songs
Canadian pop songs
Number-one singles in the United States
Grammy Hall of Fame Award recipients
RCA Victor singles